Shrimant Naro Shankaraji Gandekar Pant Sachiv (also known as Naro Shankar) was a Sardar of the Maratha Empire. He was the hereditary Pant Sachiv (Chief Secretary) during Chhatrapati Shahu I reign.
After the death of his father Shankaraji Narayan Sacheev in 1707, Naro Shankar won the favour of Shahu by fighting many battles in the defence of the Maratha Empire. In 1707 Shahu confirmed the Jagir of Shankaraji Narayan Sacheev to his son Naro Shankar and the hereditary title Pant Sachiv. He was the 2nd ruler of the princely state of Bhor during the reign (1707–1737).

References

People of the Maratha Empire